WQSB (105.1 FM) is a radio station licensed to serve Albertville, Alabama, United States.  The station is owned by Sand Mountain Broadcasting Service, Inc.

It broadcasts a country music format to the greater Gadsden, Alabama area. 
WQSB currently is known as the Country Giant in Albertville, Alabama at 105.1 FM.

WQSB airs Alabama's #1 high school football scoreboard show.

References

External links
 
 
 

QSB
Country radio stations in the United States
Radio stations established in 1949
1949 establishments in Alabama